The mayor of the City of Pensacola is the chief executive officer and holder of the city of Pensacola, Florida. The mayor's office is located at the city hall at 222 West Main Street in Downtown, and owns an estate near the Texar Bayou in East Pensacola.

Powers and duties
In 2009, the duties of the mayor of Pensacola were expanded under the "strong mayor" governing philosophy. Since then, the mayor's duties have shifted from a ceremonial position to the chief decision maker in the city government.

List of mayors

See also

Pensacola, Florida
History of Pensacola, Florida

References

External links
 
 

Government of Florida
1820 establishments in the Spanish Empire